Geoffroy Saint-Hilaire may refer to:

 Étienne Geoffroy Saint-Hilaire (1772–1844), French naturalist
 Isidore Geoffroy Saint-Hilaire (1805–1861), French zoologist who coined the term ethology, son of Étienne Saint-Hilaire
 Albert Geoffroy Saint-Hilaire (1835–1919), French zoologist, coined the binomial nomenclature name for the Chinese monal pheasant, son of Isidore Saint-Hilaire